Apollo House was a 9-storey office block in Tara Street, Dublin, Republic of Ireland.

History

Apollo House was built in 1969 for the Norwich Union Group by Block Office and Shop Investments. 7 older buildings were demolished to make way for the 9-storey office block with street level retail, a car park, and a petrol station. It was constructed with pre-cast concrete blocks, and designed by David Keane, who also designed Phibsboro Shopping Centre.

Occupation

The empty office block was occupied by 40 homeless people for 27 days from 15 December to 12 January 2017, supported by the Irish Housing Network under the campaign entitled "Home Sweet Home". Over the course of the occupation, 205 homeless people were housed in the block. Among the supporters of the occupation were Glen Hansard, Christy Dignam, Jim Sheridan, Kodaline, and Hozier.

Demolition and redevelopment
After the demolition of Apollo House in June 2018, the remains of a large stone building were discovered on the site which are thought to be the chapel which was known to have existed in this area.

The site was purchased by developer Pat Crean's Marlet Property Group for an estimated €56 million from the National Asset Management Agency. Permission was granted for a mixed development on the site, alongside the adjoining College House and Screen Cinema, under the new name College Square. This was despite objections from An Taisce about the impact of a new development that is proposed to be taller than the previous Apollo House.

See also
 Hawkins House (Dublin)
 Screen Cinema

References

Office buildings in the Republic of Ireland
Office buildings completed in 1969
Buildings and structures demolished in 2018
Buildings and structures in Dublin (city)
1969 establishments in Ireland
2018 disestablishments in Ireland
Brutalist architecture in Ireland
Demolished buildings and structures in Dublin
20th-century architecture in the Republic of Ireland